Balance Rock is an unincorporated community in Tulare County, California, United States. The community was named after Balance Rock, a geographic feature in the area, by a Mrs. Shively in 1900. Balance Rock once had a post office, which operated from 1935 to 1950.

References

Unincorporated communities in Tulare County, California
Unincorporated communities in California